The following lists the number one singles on the Australian Singles Chart during the 1960s.

The source for this decade is the "Kent Music Report". These charts were calculated in the 1990s in retrospect, by David Kent, using archival data.

1960

Other hits
Songs peaking at number two included "Running Bear" by Johnny Preston, "If I Had a Girl" by Rod Lauren, "What in the World's Come Over You" by Jack Scott, "Mule Skinner Blues" by The Fendermen, "Itsy Bitsy Teenie Weenie Yellow Polkadot Bikini" by Brian Hyland, "I Found a New Love" / "Defenceless" by Lonnie Lee, "Please Don't Tease" by Cliff Richard and The Shadows, "Peter Gunn" by Duane Eddy and The Rebels, and "North to Alaska" by Johnny Horton.

Other hits (with their peak positions noted) were "Teen Angel" by Mark Dinning (3), "Little Boy Lost" by Johnny Ashcroft (3), "Cathy's Clown" by The Everly Brothers (3), "What a Mouth (What a North and South)" by Tommy Steele (3), "When Will I Be Loved" / "Be-Bop-A-Lula" by The Everly Brothers (3), "Let's Think About Living by Bob Luman (3), "My Heart Has a Mind of Its Own" / "Malaguena" by Connie Francis (3), "In The Mood" by Ernie Fields (4), "Handy Man" by Jimmy Jones (4), "Sink the Bismark" by Johnny Horton (4), "A Kookie Little Paradise" by Jo Ann Campbell (4), "Volare" / "I'd Do it Again" by Bobby Rydell (4), "Yes Sir That's My Baby" by Col Joye & The Joy Boys (5), "Greenfields" by The Brothers Four (5), and "I'm Sorry by Brenda Lee (6).

Hits by Australasian artists included "(Making Love on A) Moonlit Night" by Col Joye, "Turn the Lights Out, Johnny" / "Koala Bear" by Johnny Devlin and The Devils with The Delltones, and "Do You Love Me"/"Whiplash" by Rob E.G.

1961

Other hits
Songs peaking at number two included "Calcutta" by Lawrence Welk, "Wheels" by The String-A-Longs, "Theme From Exodus" by Ferrante & Teicher, "A Hundred Pounds of Clay" by Gene McDaniels, "Hats Off to Larry" by Del Shannon, "Together" by Connie Francis, and "(Marie's the Name) His Latest Flame" / "Little Sister" by Elvis Presley.

Other hits (with their peak positions noted) were "Sway" by Bobby Rydell (3), "Calendar Girl" by Neil Sedaka (3), "Good Time Baby" / Cherié by Bobby Rydell (3), "Little Devil" by Neil Sedaka (3), "Baby Face" and "Take Good Care of My Baby" by Bobby Vee (3), "Hit The Road Jack" by Ray Charles (3), "Corrine, Corrina" by Ray Peterson (4), "Will You Love Me Tomorrow" by The Shirelles (4), "Blue Moon" by The Marcels (4), "Moody River" by Pat Boone (4), "Smoky Mokes" by The Joy Boys (4), "Where the Boys Are" by Connie Francis (5), "Running Scared" / "Love Hurts" by Roy Orbison (5), "You're Sixteen" by Johnny Burnette (6), and "I've Told Every Little Star" by Linda Scott (6).

Hits by Australasian artists included 	
"Ready for You" / "Save the Last Dance for Me" by Johnny O'Keefe, "Six White Boomers" by Rolf Harris, "Got a Zack in the Back of Me Pocket" by Johnny Devlin and The Bricks with The Deeners, and "Goin' Steady" / "Naughty Girls" Col Joye and The Joy Boys.

1962

Other hits
Songs peaking at number two included "Big Bad John" by Jimmy Dean, "When the Girl in Your Arms Is the Girl in Your Heart" by Cliff Richard, "Run to Him" / "Walkin with My Angel" by Bobby Vee, "Chip Chip" by Gene McDaniels, "Dream Baby (How Long Must I Dream)" / "The Actress" by Roy Orbison, "Wonderful Land" / "Stars Fell on Stockton" by The Shadows, "Si Senoe (I Theenk?)" by Rob E.G., "Silver Threads and Golden Needles" by The Springfields, "Alley Cat" by Bent Fabric, "Telstar" by The Tornados, and "The Cha-Cha-Cha" by Bobby Rydell.

Other hits (with their peak positions noted) were "Runaround Sue' by Dion DiMucci (3), "Tower of Strength" by Gene McDaniels (3), "The Twist" by Chubby Checker (3), "A Little Bitty Tear" by Burl Ives (3), "(The Man Who Shot) Liberty Valance" by Gene Pitney (3), "Do You Want To Dance" / "I'm Looking Out the Window" by Cliff Richard (3), 'Happy Birthday Sweet Sixteen" by Neil Sedaka (4), "Have You Ever Been to See Kings Cross" by Frankie Davidson and The Sapphires (4), "She's Not You" / "Just Tell Her Jim Said Hello" by Elvis Presley (5), "Today's Teardrops" by Col Joye and The Joy Boys (5), "Sing!" / "To Love" by Johnny O'Keefe (6), and "The Young Ones" by Cliff Richard and The Shadows (6).

Hits by Australasian artists included "Southern 'Rora" by The Joy Boys, "You're Driving Me Mad" by Judy Stone, and "Get A Little Dirt On Your Hands" by The Delltones

1963

Other hits
Songs peaking at number two included "The Night Has a Thousand Eyes" by Bobby Vee, "Rhythm of the Rain" by The Cascades, "Foot Tapper" by The Shadows, "(You're the) Devil in Disguise" by Elvis Presley, "If I Had a Hammer" by Trini Lopez, "Washington Square" by The Village Stompers, and "Hootenanny Hoot" by Sheb Wooley.

Other hits (with their peak positions noted) were "Blame It on the Bossa Nova" by Eydie Gormé (3), "Summer Holiday" / "Dancing Shoes" by Cliff Richard and The Shadows (3), "How Do You Do It?" by Gerry and the Pacemakers (3), "Falling" / "Distant Drums" by Roy Orbison (3), "Atlantis" by "I Want You to Want Me" by The Shadows (3), "Wipe Out" / "Surfer Joe" by The Surfaris (3), "She Loves You" / "I'll Get You" by The Beatles (3), "Come a Little Bit Closer" by The Delltones (4), 	
"Jezebel" / "Stage to Cimarron" by Rob E.G. (4), "Blue Velvet" by Bobby Vinton (4), "Little Band of Gold" by James Gilreath (5), "María Elena" by Los Indios Tabajaras (5), "Ruby Baby" by Dion DiMucci (6), and "I Like It" by Gerry and the Pacemakers (6).

Hits by Australasian artists included "(And Her Name is) Scarlet" by The De Kroo Brothers, and "Proud of You" by Jay Justin.

1964

Other hits
Songs peaking at number two included "Secret Love" by Kathy Kirby, "A World Without Love" by Peter & Gordon, "My Boy Lollipop" by Millie, "Wishin' and Hopin'" by Dusty Springfield, "The House of the Rising Sun" by The Animals, "Do Wah Diddy Diddy" by Manfred Mann, "William Tell Overture" by Sounds Incorporated, and "When You Walk in the Room" by The Searchers.

Other hits (with their peak positions noted) were "Dominique" by The Singing Nun (3), "Twenty Four Hours from Tulsa" by Gene Pitney (3), "Don't Talk to Him' by Cliff Richard (3), "Glad All Over" by The Dave Clark Five (3), "Diane" by The Bachelors (3), "Suspicion" by Terry Stafford (3), "Poison Ivy" / Broken Things" by Billy Thorpe and the Aztecs (3), "Rag Doll" by The Four Seasons (3), "Such a Night" by Elvis Presley (3), "You Don't Own Me" by Lesley Gore (4), "Needles and Pins" by The Searchers (4), "Bits and Pieces" / "All of the Time" by The Dave Clark Five (4), "Viva Las Vegas" / "What'd I Say" by Elvis Presley (4), Twist and Shout EP by The Beatles (5), "Hangin' Five" by The Delltones (5), "Hello, Dolly!" by Louis Armstrong (5), and "It Hurts to Be in Love" by Gene Pitney (6).

Hits by Australasian artists included "The Crusher" by The Atlantics, "When You're Not to Wear" by Rob E.G., "She Wears My Ring" / "Let's Love Tonight" by Johnny O'Keefe, "Mashed Potato" / "Don't Cha Know" by Billy Thorpe and the Aztecs, and "4,003,221 Tears From Now" by Judy Stone.

1965

Other hits
Songs peaking at number two included "Little Red Rooster", "The Last Time" / "Play With Fire", and  "Get Off of My Cloud" by The Rolling Stones, "Over the Rainbow" / "That I Love", and "Twilight Time" / "My Girl Josephine" by Billy Thorpe and the Aztecs, "Ferry Cross the Mersey" by Gerry and the Pacemakers, "A World of Our Own" by The Seekers, "Mission Bell" by P. J. Proby, "Il Slienzio" by Nini Rosso, "Eve of Destruction" by Barry McGuire, "What's New Pussycat?" by Tom Jones, "Sing C'est La Vie" by Sonny & Cher, and "Yesterday" / "Act Naturally" by The Beatles.

Other hits (with their peak positions noted) were "Leader of the Pack" by The Shangri-Las (3), "Do What You Do Do Well" by Ned Miller (3), "It's Not Unusual" by Tom Jones (3), "Can't You Hear My Heartbeat" / "Silhouettes" by Herman's Hermits (3), "Paper Tiger" by Sue Thompson (3), "Mr. Tambourine Man" by The Byrds (3), "She's So Fine" / "The Old Oak Tree" by The Easybeats (3), "Fool, Fool, Fool" by Ray Brown & the Whispers (3), "Unchained Melody" by The Righteous Brothers (3), "I Got You Babe" by Sonny & Cher (3), "Tell Him I'm Not Home" / "Call on Me" by Normie Rowe (3), "Ringo" by Lorne Greene (4), "Goldfinger" by Shirley Bassey (4), "The Hucklebuck" by Brendan Bowyer (4), "If You Gotta Go, Go Now" by Manfred Mann (4), "You've Lost That Lovin' Feelin'" by The Righteous Brothers (5), "Heart of Stone" / "Heart of Stone" by The Rolling Stones (5), "It Ain't Necessarily So" by Normie Rowe (5), "Walk Away (Warum Nur Warum)" by Matt Monro (6), "Goodbye" by Roy Orbison (6), and "Like a Rolling Stone" by Bob Dylan (7).

Hits by Australasian artists included "Velvet Waters" by Tony Worsley, "Wedding Ring" by The Easybeats, "Morning Town Ride" by The Seekers, and "Rockin' Robin" / "Baby What's Wrong" by The Henchmen.

1966

Other hits
Songs peaking at number two included "My Generation" by The Who, "Barbara Ann" by The Beach Boys, "As Tears Go By" / "19th Nervous Breakdown" by The Rolling Stones, "Michelle" by The Overlanders, "Elusive Butterfly" by Bob Lind, "You Don't Have to Say You Love Me" by Dusty Springfield, "Tar and Cement" by Verdelle Smith, "Bus Stop" by The Hollies, "Somewhere, My Love" (Theme from Doctor Zhivago) by The Ray Coniff Signers, "Step Back" / "Cara-Lyn" by Johnny Young and Kompany, and "Needle in a Haystack" / "I Won't Be the Same Without Her" by The Twilights.

Other hits (with their peak positions noted) were "Love Letter" / "
Dancing in the Street" by Billy Thorpe and the Aztecs (3), "The Sound of Silence" by Simon & Garfunkel (3), "Listen People" by Herman's Hermits (3), "Come and See Her" / "I Can See" by The Easybeats (3), "Pretty Flamingo" by Manfred Mann (3), "Born a Woman" by Judy Stone (3), "Black Is Black" by Los Bravos (3), "Women (Make You Feel Alright)" / "In My Book" by The Easybeats (4), "A Must to Avoid" by Herman's Hermits (4), "Tennessee Waltz Song" / "I Am What I Am" by Ray Brown & the Whispers (4), "Someday, One Day" by The Seekers (4), "Monday, Monday" by The Mamas & the Papas (4), "Sunshine Superman" by Donovan (4), "They're Coming to Take Me Away, Ha-Haaa!" by Napoleon XIV (4), "I'm a Man" by The Yardbirds (5), "The Pied Piper" by Crispian St. Peters (5), "Second Hand Rose" by Barbra Streisand (6), "Li'l Red Riding Hood" by Sam the Sham and The Phorahs (6), and "You Can't Hurry Love" by The Supremes (6).

Hits by Australasian artists included "Pride and Joy" / "The Stones I Throw" by Normie Rowe and The Playboys, "Ever Lovin' Man" and "The Loved One" by The Loved Ones, "Someday" by Tony Barber, and "Let the Little Girl Dance" / "Answer Me" by Grantley Dee.

1967

Other hits
Songs peaking at number two included  "When I Was Young" by Eric Burdon and The Animals, "Puppet on a String" by Sandie Shaw, "San Francisco (Be Sure to Wear Flowers in Your Hair)" by Scott McKenzie, "Itchycoo Park" by Small Faces, and "Massachusetts" by Bee Gees.

Other hits (with their peak positions noted) were "The Happening" by The Supremes (3), "It's Not Easy" by Normie Rowe (3), "Let's Spend The Night Together" / "Ruby Tuesday" by The Rolling Stones (3), "Release Me" by Engelbert Humperdinck (3), "Dedicated to the One I Love" by The Mamas & the Papas (3), "Groovin'" by The Young Rascals (3), The Monkees Volume 1 EP by The Monkees (3), "The Two of Us" by Jackie Trent and Tony Hatch (3), "When Will I Be Loved?" / "Kiss Me Now" by Johnny Young and Kompany (4), "Happy Jack" by The Who (4), "A Little Bit Me, a Little Bit You" / "The Girl I Knew Somewhere" by The Monkees (4), "Waterloo Sunset" by The Kinks (4), "In the Chapel in the Moonlight" by Dean Martin (4), "The Letter" by The Box Tops (4), "Pamela Pamela" by Wayne Fontana (5), "There's a Kind of Hush" by Herman's Hermits (5), "Silence Is Golden" by The Tremeloes (5), "Lightning's Girl" by Nancy Sinatra (5), "Gimme Some Lovin'" by The Spencer Davis Group (6), and "To Love Somebody" by Bee Gees (6).

Hits by Australasian artists included "Living in a Child's Dream" by The Masters Apprentices, "What's Wrong with the Way I Live" / "9.50" by The Twilights, "Woman You're Breaking Me" by The Groop, "Heaven and Hell" / "Pretty Girl"  by The Easybeats, and "What Am I Doing Here With You?" by Bev Harrell.

1968

Other hits
Songs peaking at number two included "Daydream Believer" / "Goin' Down" by The Monkees, "Green Tambourine" by The Lemon Pipers, "Simon Says" by 1910 Fruitgum Company, "Delilah" by Tom Jones, "Young Girl" by Gary Puckett & The Union Gap, "Jumpin' Jack Flash" by The Rolling Stones, "Do It Again" by The Beach Boys, "Those Were The Days" by Mary Hopkin, and "Little Arrows" by Leapy Lee.

Other hits (with their peak positions noted) were "Tin Soldier" by Small Faces (3), "Bottle of Wine" by The Fireballs (3), Magical Mystery Tour (EP) by The Beatles (3), "The Good, the Bad and the Ugly" by Hugo Montenegro (3), "The Son of Hickory Holler's Tramp" by O.C. Smith (3), "Indian Lake" by The Cowsills (3), "I've Gotta Get a Message to You" / "Kitty Can" by Bee Gees (3), "The Ballad of Bonnie and Clyde" by Georgie Fame (4), "Gimme Little Sign" by Brenton Wood (4), "Hold Me Tight" by Johnny Nash (4), "Congratulations" by Cliff Richard (5), "Hurdy Gurdy Man" by Donovan (5), "Lazy Sunday" by Small Faces (5), "Woman, Woman" by Gary Puckett & The Union Gap (6), "The Legend of Xanadu" by Dave Dee, Dozy, Beaky, Mick & Tich (6), and  "Underneath the Arches" / "I Don't Want to Love You" by John Farnham (6).

Hits by Australasian artists included "If I Only Had Time" by John Rowles, "Cathy Come Home" / "The Way They Play" by The Twilights, "My Prayer" by The Vibrants, "Soothe Me" by The Groove, and "Words" / "Sinking Ships" by The Bee Gees.

1969

Other hits
Songs peaking at number two included "Love Child" by Diana Ross and The Supremes, "Going Up the Country" by Canned Heat, "Build Me Up Buttercup" by The Foundations, "If I Can Dream" / "Edge of Reality" by Elvis Presley, "Dizzy" by Tommy Roe, "Goodbye" by Mary Hopkin, and "In the Year 2525" by Zager and Evans.

Other hits (with their peak positions noted) were "Crimson and Clover" by Tommy James and the Shondells (3), "Gitarzan" by Ray Stevens (3), "Bad Moon Rising" by Creedence Clearwater Revival (3), "My Sentimental Friend" by Herman's Hermits (3), "A Boy Named Sue" by Johnny Cash (3), "Something in the Air" by Thunderclap Newman (3), "Sweet Caroline" by Neil Diamond (3), "Star-Crossed Lovers" by Neil Sedaka (4), "Aquarius/Let the Sunshine In" by The 5th Dimension (4), "One" by Johnny Farnham (4), "Indian Giver" by 1910 Fruitgum Company (5), "Proud Mary" by Credence Clearwater Revival (5), "Dear Prudence" by Doug Parkinson (5), "Spinning Wheel" by Blood, Sweat & Tears (5), "All Along the Watchtower" by The Jimi Hendrix Experience (6), "Give Peace a Chance" by The Plastic Ono Band (6), "Sugar, Sugar" by The Archies (6).

Hits by Australasian artists included "Saved by the Bell" by Robin Gibb, "Don't Forget to Remember" by The Bee Gees,   "La La" by The Flying Circus, "Try to Remember" by New World, and  "Such a Lovely Way" by The Groop.

See also
Music of Australia
List of UK Singles Chart number ones of the 1960s
List of Billboard number-one singles
Lists of UK Singles Chart number ones

References

David Kent's Australian Chart Book: based on the Kent Music Report
Australian Record Industry Association (ARIA) official site
OzNet Music Chart

1960s
Number-one singles
Australia Singles